Shiren the Wanderer GB: Moonlit-Village Monster is a roguelike role-playing video game developed by Aquamarine, then by Spike Chunsoft for the Android port of the game, and originally released for the Game Boy by Chunsoft in 1996. It is part of the Mystery Dungeon series. A Microsoft Windows remake, featuring enhanced graphics similar to its previous game on Super Famicom, would be later released in 1999, then re-released later with internet compatibility in 2002. A port of the remake was released on Android in 2011.

Gameplay 
In consideration of the performance of the non-colored Game Boy, the level of the monster expressed by their difference color models are displayed with a superscript number. When using the Super Game Boy add-on, a unique picture frame is displayed and color display is possible. In addition, a puzzle mode titled "Fay's Questions" has become independent from the main story, and can be selected at any time with over 100 challenges. Later on the Microsoft Windows port, the game allows you to create your own questions. In addition, the Internet edition was equipped with additional features such as wind rescues and weekly added dungeon.

Plot 
The story happens between Mystery Dungeon: Shiren the Wanderer and 4: The Eye of God and the Devil's Navel. The game's plot is about rescuing a sacrificed child and unravel the mystery of the monsters that plagues Tsukikage Village, where Shiren is stopped by during his trip.

Development 
A unique gameplay element that would be used in later games from the Shiren the Wanderer series and other Mystery Dungeon crossovers is rescuing other players via passwords. When the internet started to develop in Japan in the late 1990s, they went with the idea of player sharing passwords instead of them using the Game Boy's Game Link Cable in order to help others, since there were not many owners of the cable.

Release 
The original version on Game Boy was released on November 22, 1996. The Microsoft Windows remake of the game was released on December 8, 1999, and its Internet Edition was later released by downloading on December 20, 2002. Chunsoft released an offline downloadable content later on June 30, 2005, due to the company ending its sales then its online service on January 31, 2006. The Android port, based on its Microsoft Windows remake, was released on May 27, 2011, and its Smart Pass edition was later released on March 1, 2012.

Reception 

In a "Cross Review" from the video game magazine Famitsu, the game obtained the Platinum Hall of Fame in 1996, with a total of 36 points out of 40 by the writers. In the "Game Report Card", the review from the reader's vote of "Family Computer Magazine" gave the game a score of 23.7 points out of 30. In addition, in the Japanese video game magazine "Transcendence Daigirin '98 Spring Edition", it was positively evaluated thanks to the unique factors of the game, such as having different difficulty levels. On the other hand, "Game Boy Perfect Catalog" pointed out that the feeling of completing a dungeon after repeatedly searching for one whose rooms changes each time it enters a new floor is a common element from this series.

Footnotes

Notes

References 

1996 video games
Chunsoft games
Game Boy games
Windows games
Android (operating system) games
Roguelike video games
Japan-exclusive video games
Video games developed in Japan
Video games using procedural generation
Video games scored by Koichi Sugiyama
Mystery Dungeon